The Delhi Gymkhana Club or Delhi Gymkhana is a club in New Delhi. It is located on 2, Safdarjung Road.

History 
Originally called the 'Imperial Delhi Gymkhana Club', it was founded on 3 July 1913, at Coronation Grounds, Delhi. Its first president was Spencer Harcourt Butler, first governor of the then United Provinces of Agra and Oudh. In 1928, the club was allotted  of land in the new imperial capital of India, New Delhi, on a perpetual lease. The word imperial was dropped when India gained independence in 1947.

The club is located in the heart of Lutyens' Delhi on Safdarjung Road, per the site plan drawn up by Sir Edwin Lutyens as part of his grand design for Imperial Celebrations. Lutyens Delhi - the eighth in line - was built in an area littered with stones, tombs, domes, ruined walls and gardens of imperial former capitals - the historic crossroads and battlegrounds of India.

Controversy
In July 2014, Government of Delhi launched a crackdown on the club for its failure to pay luxury tax dues amounting to Rs 2.92 crore for the past three years.

In August 2014 it was reported that  the club has been using unauthorized bore wells and violating environmental rules. The Delhi Pollution Control Committee in August 2014 ordered closure of the Delhi Gymkhana Club; however, National Green Tribunal has asked the club to pay a penalty of Rs. 5 lakh fine to avoid closure.

See also
 Delhi Golf Club
 India International Centre

References

External links
 Official website

Others

Vij, Bhavna. Sunday, 4 May 1997. High-profile brawl in Delhi Gymkhana Club. Indian Express

New Delhi
Clubs and societies in India
1913 establishments in India
Culture of Delhi
Sport in New Delhi